In combustion, Zel'dovich–Liñán model is a two-step reaction model for the combustion processes, named after Yakov Borisovich Zel'dovich and Amable Liñán. The model includes a chain-branching and a chain-breaking (or radical recombination) reaction. The model was first introduced by Zel'dovich in 1948 and later analysed by Liñán using activation energy asymptotics in 1971. The mechanism reads as

The first reaction is the chain-branching reaction, which is considered to be auto-catalytic (consumes no heat or releases no heat), with very large activation energy and the second reaction is the chain-breaking (or radical-recombination) reaction, where all of the heat in the combustion is released, with almost negligible activation energy.

See also
Zel'dovich mechanism
Peters four-step chemistry

References

Chemical kinetics
Combustion
Reaction mechanisms
Chemical reactions